The Autovía A-70 is one of two beltways of Alicante, Spain. Specifically, it is the nearest beltway to the city and is a toll-free highway. Its length is about 31 km. 

The A-70 begins at El Campello and ends at Elche, passing near Muchamiel, Alicante and San Vicente del Raspeig. The route belongs to the Spanish Ministry of Transport, Mobility and Urban Agenda.

References 

A-70
A-70
Alicante